Repentance is reviewing one's actions and feeling contrition or regret for past wrongs, which is accompanied by commitment to and actual actions that show and prove a change for the better.

In modern times, it is generally seen as involving a commitment to personal change and the resolve to live a more responsible and humane life. In other words, being sorry for one's misdeeds. It can also involve sorrow over a specific sin or series of sins that an individual feels guilt over, or conviction that they have committed. The practice of repentance plays an important role in the soteriological doctrines of Judaism, Christianity, and Islam. Analogous practices have been found in other world religions as well. In religious contexts, it often involves an act of confession to God or to a spiritual elder (such as a monk or priest). This confession might include an admission of guilt, a promise or intent not to repeat the offense, an attempt to make restitution for the wrong, or in some way reverse the harmful effects of the wrong where possible.

Abrahamic religions
Repentance typically requires an admission of guilt for committing a wrong or for omitting to do the right thing; a promise or resolve not to repeat the offense; an attempt to make restitution for the wrong, or in some way to reverse the harmful effects of the wrong or the omission where possible.

Judaism 

Repentance (literally, "return", pronounced tshuva or teshuva) is one element of atoning for sin in Judaism. Judaism recognizes that everybody sins on occasion, but that people can stop or minimize those occasions in the future by repenting for past transgressions. Thus, the primary purpose of repentance in Judaism is ethical self transformation.

A Jewish penitent is traditionally known as a baal teshuva (lit., "master of repentance" or "master of return") (for a woman: , baalat teshuva; plural: , baalei teshuva). An alternative modern term is hozer beteshuva (lit., "returning in repentance"). "In a place where baalei teshuva stand", according to halakha, "even the full-fledged righteous do not stand."

Christianity 

Repentance is a stage in Christian salvation where the believer turns away from sin. As a distinct stage in the ordo salutis its position is disputed, with some theological traditions arguing it occurs prior to faith and the Reformed theological tradition arguing it occurs after faith.  In Roman Catholic theology repentance is part of the larger theological concept of penance.

Islam 

Tawba is the Islamic concept of repenting to God due to performing any sins and misdeeds. It is a direct matter between a person and God, so there is no intercession. There is no original sin in Islam. It is the act of leaving what God has prohibited and returning to what he has commanded. The word denotes the act of being repentant for one's misdeeds, atoning for those misdeeds, and having a strong determination to forsake those misdeeds (remorse, resolution, and repentance). If someone sins against another person, restitution is required.

Buddhism 
The Buddha considered shame over doing wrong (Pali: hiri) and fear of the consequences of wrongdoing (Pali:otappa) as essential safeguards against falling into evil ways and further as extremely useful in the path of purification. Also recommended was the regular practice of self-assessment or wise reflection (Pali: yoniso manasikara) on one's own actions in relation to others and the bigger picture.

In Mahayana Buddhism, one of the most common repentance verses used for reflection is Samantabhadra's Repentance Verse taken from Chapter 40 of the Flower Adornment Sutra:
<poem>
 For all the evil deeds I have done in the past 
 Created by my body, mouth, and mind, 
 From beginningless greed, anger, and delusion, 
 I now know shame and repent of them all. 
</poem>

 Hawaiian tradition 

Hooponopono (ho-o-pono-pono) is an ancient Hawaiian practice of reconciliation and forgiveness, combined with (repentance) prayers. Similar forgiveness practices were performed on islands throughout the South Pacific, including Samoa, Tahiti and New Zealand. Traditionally hooponopono is practiced by healing priests or kahuna lapaau among family members of a person who is physically ill. Modern versions are performed within the family by a family elder, or by the individual alone.

 See also 
 Buß- und Bettag, Day of Repentance and Prayer
 Mea culpa''
 Repentance Day, a public holiday of Christian prayer in Papua New Guinea

Further reading

References

External links 

 Quranic view on Repentance
 Jewish Encyclopedia: Repentance
 Theopedia: Repentance (conservative Calvinist perspective)
 Chattopadhyay, Subhasis. Review of Julia Kristeva's Hatred and Forgiveness in Prabuddha Bharata or Awakened India 121(10):721-22 (2016). ISSN 0032-6178. Edited by Swami Narasimhananda.

 
Religious practices
Religious terminology